Cumpurdinus, son of Rudolf (died after 1203) was a nobleman in the Kingdom of Hungary, who served as Judge royal between 1174 and 1181, during the reign of Béla III of Hungary.

He was last mentioned by a royal charter in 1203, when Emeric, King of Hungary instructed him to measure the borders of Merenye estate which then belonged to the Diocese of Veszprém.

References

Sources
  Kristó, Gyula; Makk, Ferenc (1981). III. Béla emlékezete [Remembering Béla III]. Magyar Helikon.
  Markó, László: A magyar állam főméltóságai Szent Istvántól napjainkig – Életrajzi Lexikon (The High Officers of the Hungarian State from Saint Stephen to the Present Days – A Biographical Encyclopedia) (2nd edition); Helikon Kiadó Kft., 2006, Budapest; .
  Zsoldos, Attila (2011). Magyarország világi archontológiája, 1000–1301 ("Secular Archontology of Hungary, 1000–1301"). História, MTA Történettudományi Intézete. Budapest. 

Judges royal
12th-century Hungarian people
13th-century Hungarian people